Ruby Creek is a  tributary to the Big South Branch of the Pere Marquette River in western Michigan in the United States. The creek runs west to east in northern Oceana County,   West-southwest of Baldwin, and is known as a lake run trout and salmon fishery.

References

Rivers of Michigan
Rivers of Oceana County, Michigan
Tributaries of Lake Michigan